Sabine Heidrun Bothe also known as Sabine Adamik (born 8 July 1960) is a German handball goalkeeper. She participated at the 1992 Summer Olympics, where the German national team was placed fourth.

References 
 Profile at sports-reference.com

1960 births
Living people
People from Havelberg
People from Bezirk Magdeburg
German female handball players
Sportspeople from Saxony-Anhalt
Olympic handball players of Germany
Handball players at the 1992 Summer Olympics
Recipients of the Patriotic Order of Merit in silver
20th-century German women